Elizabeth Hastings, later Countess of Worcester (1546 – 24 August 1621) was a noblewoman born in Scotland to Francis Hastings, 2nd Earl of Huntingdon, and Catherine Pole. On 16 December 1571 at Whitehall Palace in a triple wedding with Edward de Vere, 17th Earl of Oxford and bride, Anne Cecil, and Edward Sutton, 4th Baron Dudley and bride, Mary Howard, she married Sir Edward Somerset, 4th Earl of Worcester, son of Sir William Somerset, 3rd Earl of Worcester and Christian North.

In 1603 Elizabeth travelled to Berwick upon Tweed with other courtiers in an official party to welcome Anne of Denmark. These were chosen by the Privy Council, following the order of King James of 15 April 1603. The group consisted of two countesses, Frances Howard, Countess of Kildare, Elizabeth, Countess of Worcester; two baronesses Philadelphia, Lady Scrope and Penelope, Lady Rich; and two ladies Anne Herbert, a daughter of Henry Herbert, 2nd Earl of Pembroke, and Audrey Walsingham. A Venetian diplomat, Giovanni Carlo Scaramelli, wrote that the six great ladies were escorted by 200 horsemen. They welcomed the new queen into England on 3 June 1603.

Children
Elizabeth had fifteen children (eight sons and seven daughters).
Katherine Somerset (born ) – 30 October 1624) married William Petre
William Somerset (born c. 1576)
Henry Somerset, 1st Marquess of Worcester (born c. 1576 – 18 December 1646) married Anne Russell
Sir Thomas Somerset, 1st Viscount Somerset (born c. 1578) – died 1650) married Helen Barry
Robert Somerset (born c. 1580), married Elizabeth Powell, daughter of Sir William Powell.
Francis Somerset (born c. 1582, Died as an infant)
Lady Blanche Somerset (born c. 1583 – 28 October 1649) married Thomas Arundell, 2nd Baron Arundell of Wardour
Sir Charles Somerset (born c. 1584) married Elizabeth Powell
Margaret Somerset (born c. 1585) married Thomas Windsor, 6th Baron Windsor.
George Somerset (born c. 1586)
Edward Somerset (born c. 1588)
Elizabeth Somerset (born c. 1590) married Sir Henry Guilford
Anne Somerset married Sir Edward Wynter (c. 1560(?)-1619) of Lydney Glouster on 11 August 1595.
Frances Somerset (born c. 1596) married William Morgan, 1st baronet of Llantarnam.
Mary Somerset (born c. 1598)

Lady Elizabeth is buried next to her husband in the Somerset family chapel in the Church of St Cadoc, Raglan, Monmouthshire.

Ancestry

References

Sources
 Profile, thepeerage.com. Accessed 16 March 2008
 Profile, familysearch.org. Accessed 18 July 2009
 Richardson, Douglas, Kimball G. Everingham, and David Faris. Plantagenet Ancestry: A Study in Colonial and Medieval Families. Royal ancestry series. (p. 667) Baltimore, Md: Genealogical Pub. Co, 2004. googlebooks Retrieved 16 March 2008

1550s births
1621 deaths
Daughters of British earls
English countesses
16th-century English nobility
17th-century English nobility
16th-century English women
17th-century English women
Elizabeth Somerset, Countess of Worcester 3
Elizabeth Somerset, Countess of Worcester 3
Wives of knights